Shogun Warriors, known in Japan as , is a 1992 fighting arcade game developed by Atop and Kaneko and published in Japan by Sammy Corporation and published in North America and Europe by Kaneko. It was the first modern-fighting game based on ancient Japanese mythology (later popularized by SNK's Samurai Shodown and The Last Blade series), and was created during the fighting game trend of the 1990s that began with Capcom's Street Fighter II. Shogun Warriors was followed by a 1994 sequel titled Blood Warrior.

Gameplay
Shogun Warriors plays similarly to some other 2D versus fighting games during its release, which the player's character fights against his or her opponent in best two-out-of-three matches in a single player tournament mode with the computer or against another human player. It is controlled with an 8-way joystick and 4 buttons that perform weak and strong versions of punches and kicks. In one player mode, after selecting a character, the arcade randomly selects an opponent. The opponent order goes randomly and always leaves the last four bosses in a certain order.  Some characters stabbed by ones armed with katanas or other sharp weapons can cause blood to spurt out, which became popularized a few months later by Midway's Mortal Kombat. The main unique feature of Shogun Warriors is its "grabbing system". When the player is grabbed by the opponent, the grabber must move the joystick left and right to make it more difficult for his opponent to escape, while the one being grabbed must rapidly press any or all buttons to make it easier to escape.

Characters
There are twelve characters, each with their own fighting style and special techniques based on the ones in Japanese culture.  Besides the well-known "Winners Don't Use Drugs" screen being added to the North American version, another regional difference is that the Japanese version Fujiyama Buster contains original voice samples, while the North American and Worldwide versions were dubbed in English for some characters.

 - His appearance, quotes and actions are based on Tōyama no Kin-san, but also have the Shimazu clan's "cross in circle" wind crest on his uniform. His Japanese voice samples were replaced with sound effects in the English versions.
 - He has the ability to extend his limbs for performing long-range basic moves. He is also the only non-human character in the game.
 - Based on ancient Japanese firemen. His Japanese voice samples were later dubbed with completely different English words in the English versions. 
 - Although his true face is revealed in his motif, he wears a mask when fighting.
 - While his look fully matches his occupation when fighting, his motif shows that he has fangs like a demon.
 - The only female character in the game.  One of her moves is a fast-paced, one-leg spinning move. 
 - Although he has armor, and his motif proves that he is actually a robot, he can still bleed when attacked by blades.

Bosses
 - The first sub-boss of the game. He has fire-based attacks.
 - The second sub-boss of the game. Like Oni, Tengu's quotes are in English in all versions.
 - The third and final sub-boss of the game. He is a sōhei who has Saitō Musashibō Benkei as his motif.
 - The final boss in the game. His appearance, victory taunts, and motif are based on Ishikawa Goemon.

Reception 
In Japan, Game Machine listed Shogun Warriors on their November 1, 1992 issue as being the fifteenth most-successful table arcade unit of the month.

References

External links

Shogun Warriors at arcade-history
Fujiyama Buster at arcade-history

1992 video games
Arcade video games
Arcade-only video games
Kaneko games
Multiplayer and single-player video games
Fighting games
Video games about ninja
Video games about samurai
Video games developed in Japan